Eunymphicus is a genus of parrots in the family Psittaculidae. The genus is endemic to New Caledonia and the Loyalty Islands, and is closely related to the Cyanoramphus parakeets of Oceania.

Taxonomy
The genus Eunymphicus was introduced in 1937 by the American ornithologist James L. Peters with the horned parakeet as the type species. The name combines the Ancient Greek eu meaning "true" and the genus name Nymphicus that had been introduce in 1832 by Johann Georg Wagler for the cockatiel.

The genus now contains two species:

References

 
Psittacidae
Bird genera
Taxonomy articles created by Polbot